The Wilde Baronetcy, of London, was a title in the Baronetage of England. It was created on 13 September 1660 for William Wilde, Member of Parliament for the City of London. The title became extinct on the death of the second Baronet in 1721.

Wilde baronets, of London (1660)
Sir William Wilde, 1st Baronet (–1679
Sir Felix Wilde, 2nd Baronet (c. 1654–1721)

References

Extinct baronetcies in the Baronetage of England